Lindsay Wood (born 12 May 1961) is an English former professional cricketer. He played as a left-handed batsman and a left-arm slow bowler for Kent and Derbyshire County Cricket Clubs in the 1980s.

Wood played for the Kent Second XI team between 1979 and 1985, and made two appearances for the county First XI. He moved to Derbyshire in time for the 1986 County Championship. He played two matches for the side during 1986 but did not play first-class cricket again after the season.

References

1961 births
English cricketers
Derbyshire cricketers
Kent cricketers
Living people